Live in Concert is a recording of a live performance that Payne made in Los Angeles on November 6, 1993. It is actually an edited version of the live album An Evening With Freda Payne: Live in Concert, although six songs are longer on this album.. In this performance, Payne performs a variety of songs that were an important part in her career, particularly tracks 5 through 9. Tracks 15 through 18 is a tribute to the many female jazz singers of the 1930s and 1940s. The final track is a medley of two songs, both of which were not featured on An Evening With Freda Payne. Inside the album cover is an essay by Freda on her life and career and life in general and her special thank-yous.

Track listing

Tracks 15 to 18: Impersonation medley

Personnel
Album production staff
Produced by: Dan Musselman
Executive producer: Freda Payne
Executive producer for Varèse Sarabande: Bruce Kimmel
Recorded and mixed by: Al Johnson at Score One Recording, Inc., North Hollywood, CA
Recorded live: November 6, 1993, Los Angeles
Mastered by: Joe Gastwirt at OceanView Digital Mastering
Cover photograph: Chris Fithian
Package design: Andrea Sine
With special thanks to: Cary E. Mansfield
Live show production staff
Produced by: Denise Jackson White, Dee Jay Wyte Production and Gene Jackson, Co-Real Artists
Production stage manager/lighting designer: Larry Oberman
Set designer: Tom Brown
Sound/video: Anthony Carr
Musical director: Rahn Coleman
Stage manager: Rebecca James
Choreographer: Lorraine Fields
Stage manager: Caesar Scott
Musicians
Drums: Quinton Dennard
Percussion: Munyungo Jackson
Guitar: Mike O'Neal
Sax: Charlie Owens
Trumpet: Bobby Rodrigues
Bass: Eddie Watkins
Singers
Scherrie Payne
Joyce Vincent Wilson
Pam Vincent
Dancers
Perry Moore
William Wesley

References

Freda Payne albums
1999 live albums